Atutur is a town in the Eastern Region of Uganda.

Location
The coordinates of Atutur Town are: 01°19'25.0"N, 33°53'18.0"E (Latitude:1.323605; Longitude:33.888341).

Overview

See also
List of hospitals in Uganda
List of roads in Uganda

References

External links
 Kumi District Internet Portal

Kumi District
Populated places in Eastern Region, Uganda
Cities in the Great Rift Valley